Joseph L. Bates was an American photographer active in the 1850s-1870s.

Works
His works include stereoscopic photographs of Boston and New England scenery, landscapes and buildings. He was one of several photographers to produce stereoscopic images in the area of Glen House near Mount Washington (New Hampshire). Images he published included many of Boston's landmark buildings. He also produced still life-style images of a wreath, an arrangement of seashells, and coral.

His photographs are included in the extensive Getty Center photography collection, located in Los Angeles, California.

References
    

Architectural photographers
Year of birth missing
Year of death missing
Photographers from Massachusetts
19th century in Boston
19th-century American photographers